Mangōnui is a settlement on the west side of Mangōnui Harbour in Northland, New Zealand.  runs through it. It is the easternmost of the Taipa-Mangonui string of settlements, separated from Coopers Beach to the northwest by Mill Bay Road.

The name was frequently spelled 'Mongonui' before the 1880s, although attempts were made to correct the spelling. The name became officially Mangōnui in 2020.

History and culture 

The settlement began to serve the whalers at the beginning of the 19th century, and expanded into a trading port with kauri sawmills and farming. It became the main centre for the Far North in the 1860s, with shipping services to Auckland, and a hospital. Kaitaia became the more important centre for the kauri and kauri gum industries in the early 20th century. The government offices moved to Kaitaia in 1918, and the hospital closed in 1934. The port lost importance as roads improved and industries declined in the 1950s. It remains a fishing and farming support centre, and a tourist destination.

Taemāro Marae, situated at Mangōnui, is a meeting place for the Ngāti Kahu ki Whangaroa hapū (subtribe) of Ngāti Roha and the Ngāpuhi / Ngāti Kahu ki Whaingaroa hapū of Ngāti Aukiwa. It has no meeting house.

Demographics
Statistics New Zealand describes Mangōnui as a rural settlement. Mangōnui is part of the larger Taumarumaru statistical area.

Mangōnui had a population of 573 at the 2018 New Zealand census, an increase of 51 people (9.8%) since the 2013 census, and an increase of 63 people (12.4%) since the 2006 census. There were 207 households, comprising 288 males and 285 females, giving a sex ratio of 1.01 males per female, with 99 people (17.3%) aged under 15 years, 72 (12.6%) aged 15 to 29, 237 (41.4%) aged 30 to 64, and 168 (29.3%) aged 65 or older.

Ethnicities were 79.6% European/Pākehā, 31.4% Māori, 3.1% Pacific peoples, 3.1% Asian, and 1.6% other ethnicities. People may identify with more than one ethnicity.

Of those people who chose to answer the census's question about religious affiliation, 45.5% had no religion, 40.8% were Christian, 2.1% had Māori religious beliefs, 1.0% were Hindu, 0.5% were Buddhist and 2.1% had other religions.

Of those at least 15 years old, 60 (12.7%) people had a bachelor or higher degree, and 102 (21.5%) people had no formal qualifications. 39 people (8.2%) earned over $70,000 compared to 17.2% nationally. The employment status of those at least 15 was that 144 (30.4%) people were employed full-time, 78 (16.5%) were part-time, and 27 (5.7%) were unemployed.

Education
Mangonui School is a contributing primary (years 1–6) school with a roll of  students as of  The school opened in 1858, and one of the original buildings is still in use as the school library.

Notes

Far North District
Populated places in the Northland Region